Conservation and restoration of vehicles may refer to:
 Conservation and restoration of aircraft
 Conservation and restoration of rail vehicles
 Conservation and restoration of road vehicles
 Conservation and restoration of watercraft, preservation and care of ships and boats often undertaken by historical societies and maritime museums